Hiiy Edhenee is a 2001 Maldivian romantic drama film directed by Aishath Ali Manik. Produced under EMA Productions, the film stars Asad Shareef, Sheela Najeeb, Ali Seezan and Niuma Mohamed in pivotal roles. The film was an unofficial remake of Dharmesh Darshan's romantic film Dhadkan (2000)

Premise
Sheleen Yoosuf (Sheela Najeeb), a young woman who hails from an extremely rich and influential family is romantically linked up with Shaheen (Asad Shareef), a very poor man. When Sheleen comes to her parents with the proposal of marrying Shaheen, she is rebuked and gets an outright refusal for his bad manners and arrogant outlook. Instead they arranged her marriage with a boy from a respected family, Vishal Amir (Ali Seezan) whom Sheleen finally marries to keep her parents happy.

Cast 
 Asad Shareef as Shahin
 Sheela Najeeb as Sheleen Yoosuf
 Ali Seezan as Vishal Amir
 Niuma Mohamed as Leena
 Arifa Ibrahim as Shahin's mother
 Ahmed Nimal as Vishal's step-father
 Easa Shareef as Mohamed Yoosuf (Sheleen's father)
 Ibrahim Wisan as Afey (Vishal's half brother)
 Aishath Gulfa as Suzy (Vishal's half sister)
 Ajvad Waheed as Afeef
 Suneetha Ali (Special appearance)
 Ahmed Amir as Saleem

Soundtrack

Accolades

References

2001 films
Remakes of Maldivian films
2001 romantic drama films
Maldivian romantic drama films
Dhivehi-language films